SEC14L2 is a gene that, in humans, encodes the protein SEC14-like protein 2.

Function 

This gene encodes a cytosolic protein which belongs to a family of lipid-binding proteins including Sec14p, alpha-tocopherol transfer protein, and cellular retinol-binding protein. The encoded protein stimulates squalene monooxygenase which is a downstream enzyme in metabolism of cholesterol.

References

Further reading